Henrietta Stanhope, Countess of Chesterfield (17 November 1762 – 31 May 1813), formerly Lady Henrietta Thynne, was the second wife of Philip Stanhope, 5th Earl of Chesterfield.

The earl's first wife, Anne, died in 1798, leaving one daughter, Lady Harriet Stanhope, who died unmarried in 1803.

Henrietta was the third daughter of Thomas Thynne, 1st Marquess of Bath, and his wife, the former Lady Elizabeth Cavendish-Bentinck. One of her older sisters, Louisa, became Countess of Aylesford, and a younger sister, Sophia, became Countess of Ashburnham. Henrietta's childhood was interrupted by a serious illness, as reported by Mary Granville in a letter of 1770:I am first going to Lady Weymouth, who is pretty well, but has been a good deal hurried with poor Miss H. Thynne's illness; the poor little creature has undergone much severer discipline than I thank God was necessary in your case – having been twice blooded and once blistered, but the doctors now think her much better.

She married the earl on 2 May 1799, in Grosvenor Street, London. They resided at the family seat, Bretby Hall in Derbyshire, which was rebuilt by the earl in about 1812. The couple had two children:

Lady Georgiana Stanhope (d. 1824), who married Frederick Richard West, a grandson of John West, 2nd Earl De La Warr, and had no children
George Stanhope, 6th Earl of Chesterfield (1805–1866)

The countess was a Lady of the Bedchamber to Charlotte of Mecklenburg-Strelitz, queen consort of King George III of the United Kingdom, from 1807 until her own death in 1813.
 
The countess died at the family's London home, Chesterfield House, Mayfair, aged 50 (though contemporary death notices describe her as 52). Her husband survived her by two years and died aged 59. He was succeeded in the earldom by their son, George.

Arms

References

1762 births
1813 deaths
English countesses
Daughters of British marquesses
Court of George III of the United Kingdom
Household of Charlotte of Mecklenburg-Strelitz